Zbigniew Kruszyński (born 14 October 1960), commonly known as Detsi Kruszyński or Detzi Kruszyński, is a Polish-German retired footballer. Primarily a midfielder, he was also adept in defence and attack. In an 18-year professional career, he played league football in Poland, Germany and England. He is probably best remembered for his three-year spell in Germany with 1. FC Saarbrücken, for whom he made over 130 appearances. He also made over 70 First Division appearances for Wimbledon in England. Kruszyński represented Poland at U18 level and was part of the team which finished third at the 1978 European U18 Championship. Kruszyński currently coaches youth football in Ohio, United States.

Career

Lechia Gdańsk 
Born in Tczew, Kruszyński began his career as a youth at hometown club Unia Tczew, before moving to II Liga club Lechia Gdańsk in 1976. Despite being aged just 16, he made his professional debut in a league match versus Olimpia Poznań on 5 June 1977, coming on as a substitute for Andrzej Głownia after 67 minutes. Kruszyński broke into the team the 1977–78 season, making 23 league appearances and scoring two goals and improving again the following year, scoring ten goals in 34 appearances. Kruszyński travelled with the club to take part in a friendly tournament in West Germany in the summer of 1979 and refused to return to Poland with the team, which caused the Polish FA to suspend him for a year. He made 61 appearances and scored 13 goals for Gdańsk.

Hamburger SV II 
While in West Germany, Kruszyński signed for Hamburger SV II in 1979. In a three-season spell, he failed to make an appearance for the club's first team, but trained with high-profile players Franz Beckenbauer, Kevin Keegan, Manfred Kaltz and Felix Magath.

SC Concordia von 1907 
Kruszyński joined Oberliga Nord club SC Concordia von 1907 in 1982 and departed at the end of the 1982–83 season.

1. FC Saarbrücken 
Kruszyński moved back up the German pyramid to sign for 2. Bundesliga club 1. FC Saarbrücken in 1983. He quickly established himself in the team, missing just five league games during the 1983–84 season. Kruszyński made 32 appearances to help Saarbrücken to a third-place finish in the 1984–85 season and though he did not play, the club secured promotion to the Bundesliga after winning a playoff versus Arminia Bielefeld. Now playing in the Bundesliga, Kruszyński was moved from his forward position back into the defence and made 32 appearances in a poor season which saw Saarbrücken relegated straight back to the 2. Bundesliga. Kruszyński departed the club at the end of the 1986–87 season, after disastrous campaign in which Saarbrücken narrowly avoided relegation to the Oberliga. He made 132 appearances and scored ten goals during three years at the Ludwigsparkstadion.

FC Homburg 
Kruszyński remained within Saarland to sign for Bundesliga club FC 08 Homburg in 1987. He made 34 appearances and scored two goals during a disastrous 1987–88 season, which saw Homburg relegated back to the 2. Bundesliga after just two seasons in the top-flight.

Wimbledon 
Kruszyński moved to England to sign for First Division club Wimbledon in December 1988 for a £100,000 fee and he became the third Pole to play in the English top-flight. Utilised as a midfielder by manager Bobby Gould, he struggled to adapt to the physicality of the English game. Kruszyński dropped out of contention during the 1991–92 season and departed the club in August 1992. Kruszyński made 71 league appearances and scored four goals during three-and-a-half years with the Dons.

Brentford (loan and permanent signing) 
Kruszyński joined Third Division club Brentford on loan for the final eight games of the 1991–92 season. He played in each game in midfield and helped the Bees secure the Third Division championship and promotion to the second tier. Kruszyński signed permanently for a £60,000 fee in August 1992, but managed only eight appearances during the whole of the 1992–93 season, as the Bees suffered relegation straight back to the third tier. Kruszyński failed to see eye-to-eye with manager Phil Holder and was transfer-listed in September 1992, before being fined two weeks' wages for a training ground bust-up with coach Graham Pearce later in the year. His contract was cancelled at the end of the 1992–93 season, after making 16 appearances in just over a year at Griffin Park.

Coventry City 
After a deal to move back to Germany fell through, Kruszyński remained in England and signed for Premiership club Coventry City in September 1993. He made just three appearances and departed the club in December 1993.

Peterborough United 
After a proposed move to Second Division club Birmingham City failed to materialise, Kruszyński joined First Division club Peterborough United in December 1993. He managed just five appearances before departing London Road.

Non-league football 
Kruszyński dropped into non-league football in 1994 and played for Oxford City, St Albans City, Hayes, Chertsey Town and Kingstonian before retiring in 1997.

International career 
Kruszyński represented Poland at U18 level and was part of the team which finished third at the 1978 European U18 Championship. Kruszyński's decision to play club football in Germany in 1979 effectively ended his international career, due to citizenship issues.

Coaching career 
Since 2001, Kruszyński has coached youth players at his coaching school in Ohio, United States. At one time, the school had links with Spanish club Barcelona.

Personal life 
Kruszyński's brothers Bogdan and Andrzej were also footballers.

Career statistics

Honours 
1. FC Saarbrücken
 2. Bundesliga: 1984–85

Brentford
Football League Third Division: 1991–92

Poland U18
 UEFA European U18 Championship: 1978 (third place)

References

External links 
 

1960 births
Living people
People from Tczew
Polish footballers
Association football defenders
Association football midfielders
Association football forwards
Association football utility players
Premier League players
English Football League players
Bundesliga players
2. Bundesliga players
Hamburger SV players
SC Concordia von 1907 players
1. FC Saarbrücken players
FC 08 Homburg players
Wimbledon F.C. players
Brentford F.C. players
Coventry City F.C. players
Peterborough United F.C. players
St Albans City F.C. players
Hayes F.C. players
Kingstonian F.C. players
Sportspeople from Pomeranian Voivodeship
Isthmian League players
Lechia Gdańsk players
Oxford City F.C. players
Chertsey Town F.C. players
Polish expatriate footballers
Polish expatriate sportspeople in Germany
Expatriate footballers in Germany
Polish expatriate sportspeople in England
Expatriate footballers in England
Polish expatriate sportspeople in the United States